Heavy Metal Hippies is the eleventh studio album by Japanese heavy metal band Loudness. It was recorded and mixed by Chris Tsangarides and released in 1994 only in Japan. After the defection of bassist Taiji Sawada, Akira Takasaki played both the lines of bass and guitar on the album. In addition, drummer and band co-founder Munetaka Higuchi was replaced by Hirotsugu Homma.

Track listing
All music by Akira Takasaki. Lyrics by Masaki Yamada, Stephan Galfas and Kayla Ritt Yamada
"Howling Rain" - 6:59
"Freedom" - 7:13
"222" (instrumental) - 2:37
"Eyes of a Child" - 6:34
"Electric Kisses" - 4:55
"House of Freaks" - 5:03
"Paralyzed" - 5:16
"Desperation Desecration" - 5:35
"Light in the Distance" - 4:56
"Broken Jesus" - 7:37

Personnel
Loudness
Masaki Yamada - lead and backing vocals
Akira Takasaki - guitars, bass, sound effects, producer
Hirotsugu Homma  - drums

Production
Chris Tsangarides - engineer, mixing, sound effects
Stephan Galfas - vocal production, backing vocals
Shinichi Naito - assistant engineer
Bobby Hata - mastering

References

1994 albums
Loudness (band) albums
Warner Music Japan albums